Dzyanis Karolik (born 7 May 1979) is a retired Belarusian professional football player. His latest club was Smorgon.

Career
Born in Zhodino, Karolik has played professional football in the Belarusian Premier League with FC Belshina Bobruisk, FC Torpedo Zhodino, FC Gomel, FC Naftan Novopolotsk and FC Darida Minsk Raion. He won the league with Belshina Bobriusk.

Honours
Belshina Bobruisk
Belarusian Premier League champion: 2001
Belarusian Cup winner: 2000–01

References

External links

1979 births
Living people
Belarusian footballers
FC Torpedo-BelAZ Zhodino players
FC Belshina Bobruisk players
FC Gomel players
FC Naftan Novopolotsk players
FC Darida Minsk Raion players
FC Gorodeya players
FC Slutsk players
FC Smorgon players
Association football forwards
People from Zhodzina
Sportspeople from Minsk Region